Calytrix desolata is a species of plant in the myrtle family Myrtaceae that is endemic to Western Australia.

It blooms between March and October producing pink-purple-blue star shaped flowers.

Found on plains, rises and creekbeds in the Mid West and the Goldfields-Esperance regions of Western Australia where it grows on sandy soils over weathered granite.

References

Plants described in 1898
desolata
Flora of Western Australia